Abagrotis nanalis is a moth of the family Noctuidae first described by Augustus Radcliffe Grote in 1881. It is found in North America from southern British Columbia east to southwest Saskatchewan and western North Dakota, south to northern New Mexico and California.

The wingspan is about 25 mm. Adults are on wing from August to September in one generation in Alberta.

External links

Abagrotis
Moths of North America
Moths described in 1881